{{DISPLAYTITLE:C22H30N2O2}}
The molecular formula C22H30N2O2 (molar mass: 354.485 g/mol) may refer to:

 A-796,260
 Eprozinol
 Martinostat

Molecular formulas